The Oil Raider is a 1934 American action film directed by Spencer Gordon Bennet and starring Buster Crabbe, Gloria Shea and George Irving. It was produced on Poverty Row as a second feature and was distributed by independent company Mayfair Pictures.

Plot 
Dave Warren, a wildcatter, has uncovered a potentially profitable oil well but needs more money to keep drilling. He borrows fifty thousand dollars from an investment banker Varley. When Varley's financial interests suffer a severe collapse he needs urgent money and hires men to sabotage the drilling so that he can foreclose and use the oil to recover his fortunes. However, his own daughter Alice has fallen in love with Warren.

Cast 
Buster Crabbe as Dave Warren
Gloria Shea as Alice Varley
George Irving as J. T. Varley, Investment Banker
Max Wagner as Simmons, a Troublemaker
Emmett Vogan as Jim Walker
Harold Minjir as Morrison
 Tetsu Komai as 	Chinese Cook
 Tom London  as Oil Well Driller 
 Chuck Morrison as Oil Well Driller 
 Hal Taliaferro as	Oil Well Driller

References

Bibliography
 Pitts, Michael R. Poverty Row Studios, 1929–1940: An Illustrated History of 55 Independent Film Companies, with a Filmography for Each. McFarland & Company, 2005.

External links 

1934 films
1930s romance films
1930s action adventure films
1930s English-language films
American black-and-white films
American action adventure films
American romance films
Mayfair Pictures films
Films directed by Spencer Gordon Bennet
1930s American films